Rodney McDonald (born 20 March 1966) is an English former professional footballer. His sons, Clayton and Rod  are also professional footballers.

In 1996, during his spell playing for Partick Thistle, McDonald received a yellow card for making the sign of the cross on leaving the field of play at half-time.

References

External links

1967 births
Living people
Footballers from Westminster
English footballers
Walsall F.C. players
Partick Thistle F.C. players
Southport F.C. players
Chester City F.C. players
Accrington Stanley F.C. players
Barrow A.F.C. players
Runcorn F.C. Halton players
Northwich Victoria F.C. players
Droylsden F.C. players
English Football League players
Scottish Football League players
Colne Dynamoes F.C. players
Winsford United F.C. players
Association football forwards